Ouarizane is a town and commune in Relizane Province, Algeria.

References

Communes of Relizane Province
Cities in Algeria
Algeria